Joy Bhattacharjya is an Indian quizzer, orator, writer and sports producer. He is the former Team Director of the Indian Premier League franchise Kolkata Knight Riders (KKR). He also served as the director for the FIFA U-17 World Cup, which was conducted in India, and later as CEO of the inaugural Pro Volleyball League.

Career 
On 15 July 2022,  Federation of Indian Fantasy Sports FIFS names Joy Bhattacharjya as Director-General

References

Indian Premier League
Indian cricket commentators
Living people
Indian sports broadcasters
Year of birth missing (living people)